XHGZ-FM is a radio station in Gómez Palacio, Durango on 99.5 FM. It is owned by Radiorama and operated by GPS Media as El Viejón with a grupera format.

History

XHGZ began in 1957 as XEGZ-AM 790, licensed to Ciudad Lerdo and owned by Alejandro Stevenson. Formats over the years included La Pantera, Radio 790 and Rockola 790.

The station received permission to migrate to FM in 2011. On AM, Radiorama placed some of its own formats on 790, such as W Radio and Colorín ColorRadio; when the station migrated, it took on the Milenio Radio format of news-talk programming.

In March 2018, XHGZ converted to La Lupe, a new grupera classic hits format from Multimedios.

In 2019, Multimedios Radio took control of the FM station of the Grupo Radio Centro Torreón cluster; La Lupe moved to the 99.9 frequency. After a simulcast, Radiorama returned to operating XHGZ-FM as Regional Mexican "La Poderosa". A further change in the cluster saw GPS Media's El Viejón, previously at 101.1 MHz, move down to 99.5 in August 2020.

References

Radio stations in Durango
Radio stations in the Comarca Lagunera